MV B. P. Newton was a Norwegian tanker built in 1940, and sunk by German submarine off South America in July 1943.

Construction
The ship was built by Kockums Mekaniska Verkstads AB in Malmö in 1940. She had a tonnage of 10,200 dwt.

Second World War
The ship was among the Kvarstad vessels which were held in arrest in Gothenburg during the German occupation of Norway from 1940. The ship's maiden voyage was with Operation Performance, an attempt by the British to release a number of Norwegian merchant ships then interned in the neutral Swedish port of Gothenburg, starting on 31 March 1942. B. P. Newton was one of the two ships that managed to escape to Britain.

In 1942 and 1943 the ship sailed on the Atlantic Ocean between Great Britain and America.

Sinking, and fate of crew
B. P. Newton departed from Trinidad on 3 July 1943, sailing with the convoy TJ 1. The ship, loaded with gasoline, was set in fire. 24 of the crew members were saved, while 23 perished.

References

Citations

Bibliography

1940 ships
Ships built in Malmö
Ships of Nortraship
Tankers of Norway
Maritime incidents in July 1943
World War II shipwrecks in the Caribbean Sea
Ships sunk by German submarines in World War II